Santiago Fonseca (born 30 December 1953) is a Honduran racewalker. He competed in the men's 20 kilometres walk at the 1976, 1984 and the 1988 Summer Olympics.

References

1953 births
Living people
Athletes (track and field) at the 1975 Pan American Games
Athletes (track and field) at the 1976 Summer Olympics
Athletes (track and field) at the 1979 Pan American Games
Athletes (track and field) at the 1983 Pan American Games
Athletes (track and field) at the 1984 Summer Olympics
Athletes (track and field) at the 1987 Pan American Games
Athletes (track and field) at the 1988 Summer Olympics
Honduran male racewalkers
Pan American Games competitors for Honduras
Olympic athletes of Honduras
Place of birth missing (living people)
Central American Games silver medalists for Honduras
Central American Games bronze medalists for Honduras
Central American Games medalists in athletics